Water Tower Place is a large urban, mixed-use development comprising a  shopping mall, hotel, theater, and condominiums in a 74-story skyscraper in Chicago, Illinois, United States. The mall is located at 835 North Michigan Avenue, along the Magnificent Mile. It is named after the nearby Chicago Water Tower, and is owned by affiliates of Brookfield Property Partners.  As reported by the Chicago Suntimes, Brookfield Property Partners handed the keys to the project back to their lender, MetLife, owing to numerous retail vacancies following the closing of Macy's and the impact of COVID and increasing crime along the once-Magnificent Mile.

History
Originally planned in the late 1960s by the Mafco Company (the former shopping center development division of Marshall Field & Co.), the skyscraper was eventually built in 1975 by Urban Retail Properties, a company led by Philip Morris Klutznick and his son Thomas J. Klutznick. The project received a J.C. Nichols Prize from the Urban Land Institute in 1986. Modernist architect Edward D. Dart, of Loebl Schlossman Bennett and Dart, was the chief architect.

The tower section is a 78-story, 859-foot (262 m) reinforced concrete slab, faced with gray marble, and is the eighth tallest building in Chicago and the twenty-sixth tallest in the United States. When built, it was the tallest reinforced concrete building in the world. It contains a Ritz-Carlton hotel, condominiums and office space, and sits atop a block-long base containing an atrium-style retail mall that fronts on the Magnificent Mile.

Water Tower Place's opening changed the economic dynamics of the Magnificent Mile by bringing middle-class shops to what had been a street dominated by luxury retailers, tony hotels, and expensive apartments. It shifted downtown Chicago's retail center of gravity north from State Street to North Michigan Avenue. Decades after its construction, its residences and hotel remain sought after addresses, and the mall is typically fully leased, drawing large enough crowds that some retailers operate outlets both inside the mall and outside it along Michigan Avenue. 

The 360 condo units in the tower were designed in 1974. Richard A. Meyers Realty, Inc., was the contracted sales and marketing consultant. In a recessionary market, the company was given the challenge of demonstrating the product and obtaining hard contracts before construction began.  This was a challenging assignment in the recessionary climate of 1974–1976.

A detailed product research study was conducted by Gary S. Meyers, which included examining on a room-by-room basis over luxury 100 high-rise condominiums in the Chicago metropolitan area and a like number around the nation. The product analysis was then compared with sales velocities of other projects to determine buyer needs and wants and their respective acceptable price points. The net result was a mathematically designed housing product that allowed for specific space allocation for each room in each unit. The results were efficient units, where each room had a competitive advantage. Because of this unique design methodology, the condominium units are still considered well designed, even decades after their construction. 

After the product was designed, Richard A. Meyers Realty, Inc. and Urban Investment and Development took an entire floor in the Blair Building, 645 N. Michigan Avenue, and built several full-scale condominium units, several blocks away from the site. This combined marketing approach produced sales of over 100 units before the building was ready for occupancy, a pace that surpassed units ready for occupancy in competing buildings during the same period.

In 2001, a program of refurbishments was begun, including enclosing the exterior arcade along Michigan and adding a loading dock in the middle of the block for additional retail space. Also included were updates to the escalators and fountains leading into the mall from North Michigan Avenue lobby, as well as enhancements to the sidewalk areas, the mall's exterior facades, and department store entrances. Some of the changes included the addition of exterior glass walls and display areas for the department stores, some small specialty retail space in the renovated lobby area, and large exterior rounded, corner glass bay windows and lighted "fins" on the North Michigan Avenue and side street exterior walls of the mall. These last additions broke up the boxy nature of the original architecture and added some dimension and scale to the monolithic marble walls. The interior fountain between the escalators leading from the North Michigan Avenue lobby were also updated with a tiered "pop jet" fountain with cascading waterfalls and balls of water, controlled by computer-based choreography.

The Rouse Company acquired the center in 2002 during the breakup of the then Dutch-owned Urban Shopping Centers. In 2008, a 3-story American Girl Store replaced Lord & Taylor, which closed in spring of 2007.

Oprah Winfrey acquired 4 units in the building. The condos were sold in 2015 and 2016 for slightly more than what she paid.

On August 14, 2020, WGN-TV announced Macy's would be leaving, although they declined to give a comment. Then in September 2020, Macy's reopened their store and all operations will continue. On January 5, 2021, it was announced that Macy's would be closing as part of a plan to close 46 stores nationwide. The store officially closed its doors on March 21, 2021. This was a part of the early 2021 downsizing by Macy's Inc.

The Ritz-Carlton, Chicago
The Ritz-Carlton Chicago is a 435-room hotel at Water Tower Place.

The builders of Water Tower Place acquired the rights to use the Ritz-Carlton name and logo when they opened a hotel in the tower in 1975. This was before the modern Ritz-Carlton chain was established in the mid-1980s, using the same name and logo, which have been around since the early 20th century, in use at various hotels. Also under terms of the agreement, no other hotel was permitted to use the Ritz-Carlton name in the Chicago area while the agreement was still in effect, meaning that the modern Ritz-Carlton chain was never able to operate a hotel in Chicago, only a nearby condominium, which they built in 2012.

So that their hotel would be part of a chain, the owners of Water Tower Place contracted Four Seasons Hotels to manage the hotel in 1977. It was not part of the global Ritz-Carlton chain, despite its name and use of the lion logo. In 1985 the number of guest rooms was reduced to 435.

On August 1, 2015, The Ritz Carlton Chicago ceased being a Four Seasons property and converted management and operation to Sage Hospitality of Denver, operated as a full member of The Ritz-Carlton Hotel Company LLC, and participating in and marketed with the rest of The Ritz-Carlton properties.

In 2018, U.S. News & World Report ranked the hotel as the sixth-best hotel in Illinois.

Shopping center

Water Tower Place continues to be a shopping center due to its size and its wide variety of shops, despite having no anchor after the closing of Macy's. Stores include Akira, Eileen Fisher, (Hollister Co., American Eagle Outfitters opened in fall 2007. other retailers include Lego, Bath and Body Works, Express,  Lacoste, Victoria's Secret, Sephora, Chico's, White House Black Market, J. Jill, Oakley, Finish Line, Inc., Forever 21, Sunglasses Hut, and more

The eight-level mall has over 100 shops, including American Girl store, a live theatre, and several restaurants, arranged around a chrome-and-glass atrium with glass elevators. It was one of the first vertical malls in the world, although along North Michigan Avenue it has been joined by The Shops at North Bridge and the Avenue Atrium (better known as 900 North Michigan), both of which contain higher end retail mixes.

Education
Residents of Water Tower Place are zoned to schools in the Chicago Public Schools.
Ogden School (K-8)
Wells Community Academy High School

Position in Chicago's skyline

Bus connections 
CTA

  3 King Drive  
 26 South Shore Express  
  66 Chicago  
  125 Water Tower Express  
  143 Stockton/Michigan Express  
  146 Inner Drive/Michigan Express 
  147 Outer Drive Express 
  148 Clarendon/Michigan Express 
  151 Sheridan 
  157 Streeterville/Taylor

See also
List of skyscrapers
List of tallest buildings in Chicago
List of tallest buildings in the United States
World's tallest structures

References

 Dart, Susan (1993).Edward Dart Architect..
Emporis listing

External links

Water Tower Place

Residential buildings completed in 1976
Skyscraper office buildings in Chicago
Residential condominiums in Chicago
Residential skyscrapers in Chicago
Condo hotels in the United States
Brookfield Properties
Shopping malls in Chicago
Tourist attractions in Chicago
Edward D. Dart structures
The Ritz-Carlton Hotel Company
Skyscraper hotels in Chicago
1976 establishments in Illinois
Streeterville, Chicago